Nikoleta "Nikol" Eleftheriadou  (born 17 January 1998) is a Greek female water polo player, who plays for Olympiacos and the Greece women's national team. As a player of Olympiacos, she won the 2015 Women's LEN Super Cup. She was part of the Greece women's national water polo team that won the silver medal at the 2018 European Championship in Barcelona and the bronze medal at the 2015 European Games in Baku.
She has won gold, silver and bronze medals in World and European competitions with the Greece national junior water polo squads.

References

External links
 at Baku 2015

1998 births
Living people
Greek female water polo players
Olympiacos Women's Water Polo Team players
Place of birth missing (living people)
Water polo players at the 2015 European Games
European Games bronze medalists for Greece
European Games medalists in water polo
21st-century Greek women